Sera Khandro Kunzang Dekyong Wangmo (1892–1940) or Sera Kandro is considered an emanation of Yeshe Tsogyal, and in her lifetime was a Terton of Tibetan Buddhist Vajrayana, a biographer and autobiographer, and a highly respected teacher. She taught Dudjom Rinpoche, Chatral Rinpoche, and the First Adzom Drukpa, Drodul Pawo Dorje, among other high lamas.

Sera Khandro was born into a rich family, but ran away at the age of 14 to escape an unwanted engagement, and to follow the Vajrayana teacher Drime Ozer, who was then in Lhasa on pilgrimage from Golok in Eastern Tibet. She returned with him and his students to Golok, where she lived as a renunciate. There, Sera Khandro became life partners with Garra Gyelse.

Garra Gyelsel disliked her Terma revelations, and this caused Sera Khandro to become sick. Her health returned when she left and returned to Drime Ozer with whom she subsequently revealed the specific treasure scriptures, or Terma, for which Sera Khandro is known. From when she was young she had experienced visions of Vajravarahi and exhibited many confirming indications of being a treasure revealer, a Terton. This meant that Sera Khandro had karmic connections with hidden treasures of the Nyingma Terma lineage, and to those which concealed the Termas, eighth-century Vajrayana master Padmasambhava and his consort and Vajrayana master Yeshe Tsogyal.

Sera Khandro was a teacher to many high Nyingma lamas, including Dudjom Jigdral Yeshe Dorje and Chatral Sangye Dorje.

She is considered an emanation of Yeshe Tsogyal.

In Sarah H. Jacoby's Love and Liberation: Autobiographical Writings of the Tibetan Buddhist Visionary Sera Khandro (New York: Columbia University Press, 2014), the author wrote Khandro was "one of the few Tibetan women to record the story of her life." Khandro also wrote the biography of her guru, Drimé Özer, son of the Terton Dudjom Lingpa.

Books and academic articles

References

External links 
  Sera Khandro Kunzang Dekyong Wangmo -  article at The Treasury of Lives
Rigpawiki

Tibetan Buddhists from Tibet
1892 births
1940 deaths
Female Buddhist spiritual teachers
Tibetan women